Mark Earl Dennis (born 2 May 1961) is an English former professional footballer who played at left-back for Birmingham City, Southampton, Queens Park Rangers and Crystal Palace. He was capped three times for England under-21s.

Dennis was born in Streatham, London. As a player, he was a First Division runner-up with Southampton in 1983–84, and won promotion from the Second Division in 1979–80 with Birmingham City. He was their Player of the Year the previous season. His "no nonsense attitude and tough tackling" earned him the nickname Psycho, long before this was given to Stuart Pearce; Dennis was sent off 12 times in his career.

He became manager of Fleet Town in September 2002 alongside Adrian Aymes, but left the club at the end of the 2002–03 season.

He spent time as assistant manager at Eastleigh, was a presenter on 107.8 Radio Hampshire, and acted as director of football at Winchester City.

References

External links
 

1961 births
Living people
Footballers from Streatham
England under-21 international footballers
English footballers
Association football fullbacks
Birmingham City F.C. players
Southampton F.C. players
Queens Park Rangers F.C. players
Crystal Palace F.C. players
English Football League players
English football managers
Fleet Town F.C. managers